Järlåsa Church is a church in Järlåsa, Uppsala County, Sweden. It is part of the Archdiocese of Uppsala (Church of Sweden).

History and architecture
The church has had at least two predecessors. At some point it was replaced with a wooden church, which was however in such a bad shape in the 17th century that it was replaced with the presently visible, octagonal church and demolished in the early 18th century.

The church may have been designed by Nicodemus Tessin the Elder; it was built at the initiative of Baron , who is documented with having employed Tessin for other building projects. The main, octagonal church building was built 1672-1688 and inaugurated on 29 June 1688, while the church porch wasn't finished until 1704. Originally the sacristy was a wooden annex but it was replaced with a stone structure in 1766–68.

References

External links

Churches in Uppsala County
Churches in the Diocese of Uppsala
1688 establishments in Sweden
Octagonal churches